Sha Stimuli (born Sherod Khaalis on August 9, 1978) is an American rapper from Brooklyn, New York City. He is known for his mixtape releases, beginning with Let Me Show You the Way in 2002, which earned him a spot in Source Magazines "Unsigned Hype" section. Sha Stimuli is the cousin of Dre Knight and is the younger brother of producer and rapper Lord Digga, through whom he was introduced to Brooklyn rappers such as Notorious B.I.G. and Masta Ace.

Background 
As a kid, Sha Stimuli often followed in the footsteps of his older brother, Lord Digga, learning about the music business. As a producer on the Notorious B.I.G.'s album Ready to Die, Digga often took his little brother to recording sessions at the studio, which later influenced him to become a rapper. At only 14 years old, Stimuli, as Kid Dynamite, appeared on Masta Ace's album SlaughtaHouse. Before continuing with music, Stimuli focused on his other love, basketball, playing at Brooklyn Technical High School,  and heading to Iowa to play NCAA Division 1. In 1997, he studied at Delaware State University while interning at Roc-A-Fella Records, bringing him closer to his passion of music.

Musical career 
In college, Stimuli gained recognition by being active in freestyle ciphers. Beginning his mixtape career in 2002, Stimuli released his first tape, Let Me Show You the Way, gaining him recognition in various print and online publications. Some years later, Stimuli was signed to Virgin Records and was set to release his debut album, Thee Emotion Picture, in the third quarter of 2007. Recording at Baseline Studios, Stimuli had producers Just Blaze and Nottz working on production for the album, but the process soon came to a halt due to problems that arose at Virgin Records. In early 2008, legal issues between Virgin Records and Def Jam left Sha Stimuli without a management team or label.

In early 2008, together with childhood friend DJ Victorious, Stimuli took on an endeavour to release one mixtape per month for the next 12 months. Each mixtape had a theme and concept, ranging from politics (March On Washington) to relationships (Love Jones, The Breakup), and gained him a significant amount of attention.  In October 2008 Sha was also featured on the track "Destined to Shine" from Statik Selektah's album Stick 2 the Script.

Debut album 
Sha Stimuli released his debut album, My Soul to Keep, on October 27, 2009, with Chambermusik Records / El Distribution. The first single, "Move Back," features rappers Freeway and Young Chris and was produced by Just Blaze. The album was released to critical success.

2012 
On January 23, 2012, Sha Stimuli released The Calling, the first EP from his 2012 "The Rent Tape" series of twelve EPs. This series is similar to his 2008 series, in which he released 12 mixtapes in 12 months.

2016 
On September 27, 2016, Sha Stimuli returned from a four-year hiatus from the music industry to release a new song titled "Sticks and Stones". Stimuli also announced his signing to 10 Minutes Late Records who will release his new album, "Lazarus", in 2017.

On December 11, 2016, Sha Stimuli continued his return to music and released a new song titled "New Jordans/A Poem for Mike" produced by Just Blaze and Needlz respectively. This song was met with positive reception.

Discography

Studio albums 
 2009: My Soul To Keep
 2011: Unsung Vol. 1: The Garden of Eden
 2017: Lazarus

Mixtapes 
 2003: Switch Sides
 2007: The Present & the Future
 2007: The Best of Me
 2007: The Rehab
 2008: The Wire
 2008: Love Jones
 2008: March on Washington
 2008: The Secret
 2008: While You Were Sleeping
 2008: Hotter Than July (A Tribute to Stevie Wonder)
 2008: Verses the World
 2008: March On Washington (Election Edition)
 2008: The Funeral
 2008: Never or Now EP
 2008: Please Download My Demo
 2008: The Break-Up
 2010: Overtime: My Soul to Keep
 2011: The Break-Up Pt. 2: The Proposal

Guest appearances

EPs 

 2012: The Calling
 2012: The Chills
 2012: The March
 2012: The TrueMan Show
 2012: The Emcee
 2012: The Old Me: How I Met Your Baby Mother
 2012: The New Me: Sherod Khaalis
 2012: The Savior
 2012: The 9.2.5
 2012: The Upper Room
 2012: The Motion Soundtrack
 2012: The Present

References

External links 
 HHLO.net Interview "Sha Stimuli: The Present"
 "Sha Stimuli and DJ Victorious: Monthly Mosiacs" – HipHopDX
 "REVIEW: Sha Stimuli, My Soul to Keep" – XXL
 "Sha Stimuli" – Britishhiphop.co.uk
 "Sha Stimuli – Microphone Fiend" – Six Shot
 "Sha Stimuli Presents: "Say Something" Mixtape Series" – HipHopDX
 "Sha Stimuli & DJ Victorious' 12 Mixtapes x 12 Months (Complete Collection)" – 2DopeBoyz
 "Sha Stimuli Appears on BET's The Backroom" – BET

1978 births
African-American male rappers
Delaware State University alumni
Living people
Rappers from Brooklyn
21st-century American rappers
21st-century American male musicians
21st-century African-American musicians
20th-century African-American people